Kawa Township. is a township in Bago District in the Bago Region of Myanmar. The principal town is Kawa. It is located in the east banner of Bago River and south of Bago. Kawa has 93 villages. Kawa is between Sittaung River and Bago river. The places near the river produce salts. The popular product of Kawa is Kawa Bag.

Localities
Hti Tan
Mu Du
Neik Ban
Nyaung Waing
Tha Pyay Kan

References

Townships of the Bago Region
Bago District